Wilfried Louisy-Daniel (born 29 May 1986) is a French footballer who plays for French club Racing Colombes. Louisy-Daniel is of Martiniquais descent.

Career
Louisy-Daniel was born in Versailles. In the 2005–06 season, Louisy-Daniel migrated to Germany after successfully trialing with Oberliga club DJK TuS Hordel. He spent one season at the club before returning to France. Following a prolific season with AS Poissy in the Championnat de France amateur 2, the fifth level of French football, scoring 23 goals in 28 appearances, he signed with Beauvais.

In June 2019, he joined Racing Club de France Football.

Career statistics

References

External links
 
 Profile at Soccerway
 
 Wilfried Louisy-Daniel foot-national.com Profile

1986 births
Living people
Sportspeople from Versailles, Yvelines
French footballers
French people of Martiniquais descent
Association football forwards
UJA Maccabi Paris Métropole players
AS Poissy players
AS Beauvais Oise players
SR Colmar players
US Orléans players
FC Chambly Oise players
Football Bourg-en-Bresse Péronnas 01 players
Racing Club de France Football players
FC Fleury 91 players
Ligue 2 players
Championnat National players
Championnat National 2 players
Championnat National 3 players
Footballers from Yvelines